Hea

The first beauty queen in Ecuador was Sara Chacón Zúñiga from Guayaquil, Guayas province in 1930. She wore the sash and the crown of Miss Ecuador for the very first time. The contest was inactive for more than 20 years until 1955 when Leonor Carcache won the first modern title of Miss Ecuador and became the first representative of the country to the Miss Universe pageant.

Representatives from the all 24 provinces that make up Ecuador compete annually for the title of Miss Ecuador among others. In addition to representatives to Miss Universe and Miss International; Miss Ecuador Organization also selects the candidates for Miss United Continents and Reina Hispanoamericana, under the direction of Mrs. María del Carmen de Aguayo. Mr. Julián Pico has the rights to choose and send a contestant to Miss World, Miss Supranational and Miss Grand through the national pageant CNB Ecuador since 2013 under the direction of Mrs. Tahíz Panus. The representatives for Miss Earth is selected by Ms. Katherine Espín. Mr. Rodrigo Moreira has the rights to choose and send a representative from Ecuador to Miss America Latina and Mrs. Cecilia Niemes has the rights to send a delegate to Miss Atlántico Internacional respectively.

Miss Ecuador titleholders

A.Lucía Vinueza was born in Cuenca, Azuay; but she represented the province of Guayas.
B.Mariela García was born in Cuenca, Azuay; but she represented the province of Manabí.
C.Soraya Hogonaga was born in Milagro, Guayas; but she represented the province of Pichincha.
D.Isabel Ontaneda was born in Cuenca, Azuay; but she represented the province of Pichincha.
E.Claudia Schiess was born abroad, in Basel, Switzerland; but she represented the province of Galápagos.

Provincial rankings

Miss Universe participation

A.Lucía Vinueza was born in Cuenca, Azuay; but she represented the province of Guayas.
B.Mariela García was born in Cuenca, Azuay; but she represented the province of Manabí.
C.Soraya Hogonaga was born in Milagro, Guayas; but she represented the province of Pichincha.
D.Isabel Ontaneda was born in Cuenca, Azuay; but she represented the province of Pichincha.
E.Claudia Schiess was born abroad, in Basel, Switzerland; but she represented the province of Galápagos.

Provincial rankings

a.Laura Baquero from Guayas was Miss Ecuador 1967 and had the rights to compete at Miss Universe 1967, but she was not allow to compete due to she was under 18 years of age.

Miss World participation

A.Jéssica Angulo represented Pichincha since Santo Domingo was not a province until 2008.
B.Ciprina Correia resigned the title after competing internationally. Nobody took the title over.

Provincial rankings

a.Karina Guerra from Guayas was appointed as Miss World Ecuador 1996, but she resigned. Jennifer Graham from Guayas was appointed to take over the title as the Ecuadorian representative to Miss World 1996.
b.Jéssica Angulo represented Pichincha since Santo Domingo was not a province until 2008.

Miss International participation

A.Bianka Fuentes resigned the title. Ivanna Abad took over the title.
B.Tatiana Loor Resigned the title after competing internationally. Nobody took the title over.

Provincial rankings

a.Guayas resigned the title. El Oro took the title over.

Miss Earth participation

A.Estefanía Realpe was dethroned due to not fulfilling her duties; Tatiana Torres was appointed to take over the title.

Provincial rankings

a.Pichincha was dethroned. Azuay took the title over.

Miss Supranational participation

A.Sandra Vinces did not compete because her visa was delayed.
B.Inés Panchano resigned the national title since she was 28 years old; instead, Martha Romero was appointed to compete in Miss Supranational 2014.
C.Ivanna Abad resigned the title to take over the title of Miss International Ecuador 2016. Isabel Piñeyro was appointed as Miss Supranational Ecuador 2016.
D.Justeen Cruz represented the U.S. Ecuadorian community at national competition. She is originally from Guayas.
F.Valery Carabalí represented the Coast Region at national competition. She is originally from Guayas.

Provincial rankings

a.Esmeraldas was the original winner. Guayas took over.
b.El Oro was the original winner. Guayas took over.
c.The contestant is originally from Guayas, and represented the U.S. Ecuadorian community at the national contest.
d.The contestant is originally from Guayas, and represented the Coast Reagion at the national contest.

Miss Grand International participation

A.Emilia Cevallos did not compete due to lack of sponsorship. 
B.María José Villacís resigned the title due to personal reasons. Analía Vernaza was appointed to take over the title.
C.Norma Tejada resigned the title due to her studies. Blanca Arámbulo succeeded with the title.
D.Mara Topić represented the U.S. Ecuadorian community at the national pageant. She is originally from Guayas.
E.Lisseth Naranjo resigned the title, instead, Sonia Luna was appointed, by a casting, as the new Miss Grand Ecuador 2020
F.Emilia Vásquez resigned the title, instead, Lisseth Naranjo was appointed, by a casting, as the new Miss Grand Ecuador 2022

Provincial rankings

a.Imbabura was the original winner. Pichincha took over.
b.El Oro was the original winner. Manabí took over.
c.The contestant was originally from Guayas, and represented the U.S. Ecuadorian community at the national contest.
d.Azuay was elected as the original representative, but she resigned. Sonia Luna from Guayas was appointed as the new representative.
e.Pichincha was elected as the original representative, but she resigned. Lisseth Naranjo from Azuay was appointed as the new representative.

Reina Hispanoamericana participation

A.Daniela Rodríguez resigned the title due to personal reasons. María Luisa Corrales was appointed to take over the title.

Provincial rankings

a.Guayas was the original appointed. Pichincha took over.

Miss United Continents participation

Provincial rankings

Miss América Latina participation

Provincial rankings

Miss Atlántico Internacional participation

Provincial rankings

References

External links
Official Miss Ecuador website
Past titleholders

Miss Ecuador
Beauty pageants in Ecuador